Neveneffecten is a TV-program on Flemish public television, written and performed by the cabaret quartet of the same name. It is a comedy show that contains a lot of absurd humor, based on the National Geographic documentaries. Famous directors of the show are Bart De Pauw and Jan Eelen.

Cast
Jonas Geirnaert
Lieven Scheire
Koen De Poorter
Jelle De Beule

Episodes

Season 1 (2005)
Het leven van de Kommomaan (The life of the Komomaan)
De bron van de E40 (The source of the E40)
Dieren des doods (Animals of death)
Van pool tot evenaar (From pole to equator)
Shopping center
Het geheim van de Graal (The secret of the Grail)
ITCH
De Gebroeders Tupolev (The Tupolev Brothers)

Season 2 (2008)
Schatten uit de diepte (Sea Treasures)
Sint Inc. - $interklaa$, de waarheid over 6/12 (Sint Inc. - $aint Nicola$, the truth about 6/12)
De landing (The invasion)
Armageddon
The making of

External links

Flemish television shows
Belgian television sketch shows
Belgian comedy television shows
2005 Belgian television series debuts
2008 Belgian television series endings
Television shows set in Belgium
2000s satirical television series
Surreal comedy television series
Belgian mockumentary television series
Canvas (TV channel) original programming